Nottawa Township is the name of some places in the U.S. state of Michigan:

 Nottawa Township, Isabella County, Michigan
 Nottawa Township, St. Joseph County, Michigan

Michigan township disambiguation pages